Rannahotell Pärnu is a hotel in Pärnu, Estonia. The hotel is next to Pärnu Beach and Pärnu Bay.

The hotel was built in 1937. The hotel was designed by Olev Siinmaa. Architecturally, the building is characterized by Scandinavian style.

References

External links
 

Buildings and structures in Pärnu
Hotels in Estonia